Mirjana Karanović (born 28 January 1957) is a Serbian actress, film director and screenwriter. Considered one of the best Serbian and Yugoslavian actresses of all time, she is probably the best known for her performance in her debut film Petria's Wreath (Petrijin venac), as well as for her frequent collaborations with film directors Emir Kusturica and Jasmila Žbanić. Karanović received international acclaim and a nomination for European Film Award for Best Actress for her role in Žbanić's Grbavica.

Karanović's directorial debut, A Good Wife (Dobra žena), had its world premiere at the 2016 Sundance Film Festival.

Early life 
Mirjana Karanović was born on 28 January 1957 in Belgrade. Her father Miloje was a soldier, and her mother Radmila (1932 — 2023) was a tailor.

Acting career 
She made her screen debut in the 1980 film Petrijin venac ("Petrija's Wreath"), earning accolades for her portrayal of an illiterate Serbian woman. She is best known to international audiences for her portrayal of the mother in the 1985 film When Father Was Away on Business.

In 1995, she appeared in the film Underground, directed by famous Serbian director Emir Kusturica.

In 2003, Mirjana Karanović again made history by appearing in Croatian film Svjedoci (Witnesses). She was the first actor from Serbia to appear in a Croatian film since the breakup of Yugoslavia. In the film, she played a Croatian war widow.

In 2005, she appeared in the film Grbavica by the Bosnian director Jasmila Žbanić, in which she played a Muslim woman who had to come to terms with her teenage daughter regarding the nature of her birth. In this film, she portrays a rape victim abused by Serbs during the Bosnian War.

Activism 
Karanović has been an active supporter of LGBT rights. She is one of the founders of Incest Trauma Center, which provides psychological assistance to child and adult survivors of sexual violence and their supportive persons.

In 2017, Karanović has signed the Declaration on the Common Language of the Croats, Serbs, Bosniaks and Montenegrins.

Personal life 
Karanović was never married and she doesn't have children. She is an atheist.

In 2004, she dated Bosnian actor Ermin Bravo, who is 22 years her junior.

Filmography

Awards and nominations

References

External links

 

1957 births
Living people
20th-century Serbian actresses
21st-century Serbian actresses
20th-century Serbian writers
21st-century Serbian writers
Actresses from Belgrade
Serbian actresses
Serbian film directors
Serbian theatre directors
Serbian television directors
Serbian film actresses
Serbian television actresses
Serbian stage actresses
Serbian voice actresses
Serbian screenwriters
Serbian LGBT rights activists
Golden Arena winners
Signatories of the Declaration on the Common Language
Žanka Stokić award winners
Croatian Theatre Award winners
Theatre people from Belgrade
Women television directors